Startisha is the third studio album by American rapper Naeem Juwan, also known by his stage name Spank Rock. It was released on June 12, 2020, under record label 37d03d.

Singles
The first single from the album, which features American musician Justin Vernon and Swamp Dogg, "Simulation" was released on April 16, 2020.

Critical reception
Startisha was met with "generally favorable" reviews from critics. At Metacritic, which assigns a weighted average rating out of 100 to reviews from mainstream publications, this release received an average score of 77, based on 7 reviews. Aggregator Album of the Year gave the album 75 out of 100 based on a critical consensus of 8 reviews. Jackson Howard, writing for Pitchfork, described Startisha as "undeniably more personal than Naeem's previous work," and praised the song "Stone Harbor", about Naeem's longtime boyfriend, as a "sweet spot" of the album.

Track listing

References

2020 albums
Spank Rock albums
Albums produced by Damian Taylor